Jason Katims (born November 30, 1960) is an American television writer, producer, and playwright. He is best known as the creator of several television series, including Relativity (1996), Roswell (1999–2002), Friday Night Lights (2006–2011), Parenthood (2010–2015), About a Boy (2014–2015) and Rise (2018).

Early life and family
Jason Katims was born to a Jewish family in Brooklyn, New York City, New York, and raised first in Crown Heights and later in Midwood. His father was an actor and a salesman; his mother, an English and philosophy major, "did some teachings". His parents were  "very politically active, very left-leaning." He has an older brother and sister.

Before studying theater at Queens College in Queens, New York City, he graduated from Edward R. Murrow High School.

He married his high school sweetheart; they have two children, Phoebe and Sawyer Katims.

Career
Katims was a playwright in New York until director and producer Ed Zwick asked him if he wanted to write for television and films.

In 1994, he wrote three episodes for the ABC teen drama My So-Called Life. He created Relativity in 1996 but the TV series was cancelled after 17 episodes. He subsequently created Roswell, which gained cult following.

Katims worked on the NBC series Friday Night Lights as head writer and executive producer. He  was nominated for a Writers Guild of America Award for Best New Series at the February 2007 ceremony for his work on the first season of Friday Night Lights. He was nominated for the WGA Award for Best Dramatic Series the following year at the February 2008 ceremony for his work on the second season of Friday Night Lights. Katims was nominated for Best Dramatic Series a second time at the February 2009 ceremony for his work on the third season of Friday Night Lights. He was nominated for the WGA Award for Best Drama Series for the third consecutive year at the February 2010 ceremony for his work on the fourth season. In 2011, he was honored by an award for Outstanding Writing for a Drama Series in Friday Night Lights.
 
Katims is also the creator of and executive producer for another NBC series, Parenthood, based on the feature film of the same name and a short-lived TV series that followed; Katims' series debuted in 2010 and ended in 2015. Katims based that series' Max Braverman character on his life with his own son, who has Asperger syndrome.

Katims developed About a Boy, a 2014 TV series based on the novel of the same name, for NBC.

He has written a play, The Man Who Couldn't Dance and is a former member of Stagewrights, a playwriting collective in New York City.

Katims also developed Almost Family, a 2019 TV series based on the Australian series Sisters, for Fox.

On June 15, 2020, Katims is the writer of As We See It, based on Israeli series On the Spectrum for Amazon Prime Video.

More recently, he signed a multi-year overall deal with Imagine Television.

Filmography

Film
The Pallbearer (1996)
The Vow (2012)

Television
The numbers in directing and writing credits refer to the number of episodes.

References

External links 
 

1960 births
20th-century American dramatists and playwrights
American soap opera writers
Television producers from New York City
American male television writers
20th-century American Jews
Living people
Writers from Brooklyn
Primetime Emmy Award winners
Showrunners
American male screenwriters
American male dramatists and playwrights
Queens College, City University of New York alumni
20th-century American male writers
Screenwriters from New York (state)
People from Midwood, Brooklyn
People from Crown Heights, Brooklyn
Edward R. Murrow High School alumni
21st-century American Jews